Erna Takazawa (born 1988) is the first fully qualified optometrist of Samoa. In 2014, she was awarded as one of the inaugural recipients the Queen's Young Leader Award.

Biography
Erna Fumi Rebecca Fotuofaamanuiaga Takazawa in Japan but raised in Samoa. She graduated with First Class Honors with degree in optometry from the University of Auckland in 2011 and was licensed in 2012. She is the first fully qualified optometrist on the island and began working immediately at the newly established Samoa Vision Centre.

Takazawa also works in conjunction with the National Health Service and SENESE, a support program for special needs children. Her work has led to free eye care services for children and the elderly and a reduction in cost of eyewear for adults. In 2013, she screened over 200 athletes with the Special Olympics.

In 2014, Takazawa's work was recognized when she was awarded the Queen's Young Leader Award. The annual award is given to selected citizens throughout the Commonwealth who work to better lives in their communities.

References

Living people
1988 births
Japanese people of Samoan descent
Samoan people of Japanese descent
Samoan women
Optometrists
Recipients of the Queen’s Young Leader Award